Kenneth Crosswaithe Murray (1903 – 21 April 1972) better known as K.C. Murray was an English art curator and teacher.

The second son of the chess historian H. J. R. Murray and his suffragette wife Kate Crosthwaite, Murray was an elder brother of educationalist and biographer Elisabeth Murray, and a grandson of Sir James Murray, editor of the Oxford English Dictionary.

He first studied at Balliol College, Oxford but later left in order to study art at the School of  Arts and  Crafts, Birmingham. 

Arriving in Lagos, Nigeria on December 14, 1927. He undertook book illustrations in Oyo, Oyo (south west Nigeria) and inspections  of the Arts and Crafts Schools in Kano and Katsina before returning to Lagos in January 1928 to teach arts at Kings College, Queenss College, and the Government School. 

Murray took a leave in 1929 to study pottery under Britain’s preeminent studio potter, Bernard Leach. He returned to Nigeria to teach arts at Government Training College Umuahia until 1931 when he moved to Government Training College Ibadan . 

Prompted by the discovery of Nok Head artefacts during tin mining, on 28 July 1943, Murray became Nigeria's first surveyor of antiquities in the newly created Nigeria Antiquities Service (which became the Nigerian National Commission for Museums and Monuments in 1979). During his tenure as the director of the Department of Antiquities of the colonial administration he founded the Nigerian Museum in Lagos in 1957. He was succeeded as Director by Bernard Fagg. He retired to his house in Takwa Bay Lagos, but was later recalled temporarily in 1963 to his former position until a Nigeria could take over.

Having spent the majority of his adult life in Nigeria, remained in Nigeria even after retirement and was dedicated to preserving Nigerian arts.  KC Murray died in a road accident along Ijebu Benin road on 21 April 1972. His body was interred in Ikoyi Cemetery on May 4, 1972.

References

Sources

1900s births
1972 deaths
People from Cambridgeshire
Alumni of Balliol College, Oxford
English archaeologists
English civil servants
English curators
English people of Scottish descent
People from colonial Nigeria
British expatriates in Nigeria
History of Lagos